Aleksandar Vukic was the defending champion but chose not to defend his title.

Max Purcell won the title after defeating James Duckworth 3–6, 7–5, 7–6(7–5) in the final.

Seeds

Draw

Finals

Top half

Bottom half

References

External links
Main draw
Qualifying draw

Bengaluru Open - 1
2023 Singles